Kelly Kalm (born 26 April 1997) is an Estonian racing cyclist. She rode in the women's road race at the 2016 UCI Road World Championships, but she did not finish the race.

Major results
Source: 

2014
 2nd Time trial, National Junior Road Championships
2015
 National Road Championships
2nd Junior time trial
3rd Road race
2016
 1st  Road race, National Road Championships
2017
 1st  Road race, National Road Championships
2018
 2nd Road race, National Road Championships
2020
 2nd Road race, National Road Championships

References

External links
 

1997 births
Living people
Estonian female cyclists
Place of birth missing (living people)